Imad al-Din Mahmud Junabadi (2 January 1415 – 1450s) was an Iranian bureaucrat, who served as a financial officer and vizier under the Timurid Empire. The son of Sayyid Zayn al-Abidin Junabadi, he belonged to a sayyid family from the town of Junabad in Quhistan, where they also owned land.

After the death of his father in 1425/6, Imad al-Din entered the service of Shah Rukh, and in 1443 was appointed the financial accountant of the city of Balkh by the latters powerful amir Jalal al-Din Firuzshah. Informed of embezzlement by the deputies of Balkh, Shah Rukh secretly selected Imad al-Din to investigate the situation.

With the help of Shah Rukh's son Muhammad Juki (who had access to the matters of the deputies), Imad al-Din successfully exposed the misappropriation of the revenues, and in 1444 presented the matter to Shah Rukh. After the death of Shah Rukh in 1447, Imad al-Din entered the service of the latter's son and successor Ulugh Beg, eventually becoming his vizier in 1448. Imad al-Din is later recorded as one of the divanian (high-ranking officials) of Abdal-Latif Mirza and Abul-Qasim Babur Mirza. According to the historian Sayf al-Din Uqayli, he also served Mirza Sultan Sanjar during the reign of Abul-Qasim Babur Mirza, but soon died afterwards.

References

Sources

Further reading 
 

Officials of the Timurid Empire
Viziers of the Timurid Empire
15th-century Iranian people
1415 births
1450s deaths
Year of death uncertain

People from Razavi Khorasan Province